Gupteshwor Mahadev Cave (Nepali गुप्तेश्वर महादेव गुफा) is a cave located in Pokhara-17,Chhorepatan, Kaski district, opposite to Davis Fall, the water from Davis fall passes through this cave. Gupteshwor Mahadev cave is one of the major attractions of Pokhara.

Gallery

References 

Caves of Nepal
Geography of Pokhara